Ropes Creek, a watercourse that is part of the Hawkesbury-Nepean catchment, is located in Greater Western Sydney, New South Wales, Australia.

Course and features

The creek descends  over its  course.

The creek in named in honour of Anthony Rope, a First Fleet convict who it is assumed was granted land fronting the creek.

See also 

 Rivers of New South Wales
 Ropes Creek railway line

References

External links
 
 
 
  website

Creeks and canals of Sydney
Hawkesbury River
City of Liverpool (New South Wales)
City of Fairfield
City of Penrith
City of Blacktown